Mitasareta seikatsu is a 1962 Japanese drama film directed by Susumu Hani. It was entered into the 12th Berlin International Film Festival.

Cast
 Joji Ai (as I. George)
 Ineko Arima as Junko
 Koshiro Harada as Ishiguro
 Yukari Ohba
 Takahiro Tamura

References

External links

1962 films
1962 drama films
Japanese black-and-white films
Films directed by Susumu Hani
1960s Japanese-language films
1960s Japanese films